William R. Pogue Municipal Airport , also known as Pogue Airport, is a public use airport in Osage County, Oklahoma, United States. It is owned by the City of Sand Springs and located three nautical miles (6 km) northwest of its central business district. The airport is named after the astronaut William Reid Pogue (1930-2014), a native of Oklahoma. 
This airport is included in the National Plan of Integrated Airport Systems for 2011–2015, which categorized it as a general aviation facility.

Although many U.S. airports use the same three-letter location identifier for the FAA and IATA, this airport is assigned OWP by the FAA, but has no designation from the IATA.

Facilities and aircraft 
William R. Pogue Municipal Airport covers an area of 448 acres (181 ha) at an elevation of 892 feet (272 m) above mean sea level. It has one runway designated 17/35 with an asphalt surface measuring 5,799 by 100 feet (1,768 x 30 m).

For the 12-month period ending September 21, 2012, the airport had 30,000 aircraft operations, an average of 82 per day: 99.8% general aviation and 0.2% military. At that time there were 51 aircraft based at this airport: 76% single-engine, 22% multi-engine, and 2% helicopter.

References

External links 
 Pogue Airport at City of Sand Springs website
 William R. Pogue Municipal Airport (OWP) at Oklahoma Aeronautics Commission
 Aerial image as of March 1995 from USGS The National Map
 
 

Airports in Oklahoma
Buildings and structures in Osage County, Oklahoma